ARM Aviación (formerly Aéreo Ruta Maya) is a private Guatemalan charter airline based in Zone 13, Guatemala City, with its main hub at La Aurora International Airport.

Founded in 1994, the airline employs approximately 100 people, including 20 pilots. ARM Aviación also operates a maintenance facility at La Aurora International Airport. Their three hangars are located on the east side of the airport. In addition to passenger charters, the airline operates cargo, skydiving, ambulance and agricultural flights.

Current fleet 
ARM Aviación's fleet includes:

 1 Aero Commander 500
 1 Beechcraft Baron 55
 Cessna Titan C404
 2 Cessna 208B Grand Caravan
 1 de Havilland DHC-6 Twin Otter
 1 Embraer 110
 Let L-410 Turbolet
 Pilatus PC-6

Incidents and Accidents 

 On August 24, 2008, a Cessna Caravan 208 operated by ARM Aviación (then called Aéreo Ruta Maya) crashed en route from La Aurora International Airport, Guatemala City to El Estor. The pilots performed an emergency landing in a field 60 miles east of Guatemala City after the aircraft suffered an engine failure.

References

External links 

 Official website

Airlines of Guatemala
Guatemalan brands